The Milwaukee Road Bunkhouse was built by the Chicago, Milwaukee, St. Paul and Pacific Railroad (also known as the Milwaukee Road) in 1909 to house train crews between shifts. The bunkhouse served the crews at the rail yard and division point at South Cle Elum, Washington. The bunkhouse is an L-shaped, two-storey, wood-frame vernacular building originally placed near the depot, but moved to its present location south of the rail yard around 1920 to accommodate the electric substation when the Milwaukee Road electrified. The bunkhouse continued to serve train crews until 1974. When the railroad ceased operations in Washington in 1980, it sold the property to private individuals who converted the bunkhouse into a bed and breakfast. 

Originally listed as 28 bedrooms and two bathrooms, the bunkhouse was renovated to 9 rooms  The bunkhouse, now the Iron Horse Bed and Breakfast, currently rents bunkhouse rooms as well as four separate cabooses. 

The bunkhouse was listed in the National Register because of its association with The Milwaukee Road and the development of railroads in Washington.

External links
Iron Horse Inn Bed and Breakfast current owners and operators of the bunkhouse

References
Garfield, Leonard. Milwaukee Road Bunkhouse (Kittitas County, Washington) National Register of Historic Places Registration Form. Washington, DC: U.S. Department of the Interior, National Park Service, 1989. On file at the National Register of Historic Places, Washington, DC and at the State of Washington Office of Archaeology and Historic Preservation, Olympia, Washington.

Residential buildings on the National Register of Historic Places in Washington (state)
Chicago, Milwaukee, St. Paul and Pacific Railroad
Bed and breakfasts in Washington (state)
Railway buildings and structures on the National Register of Historic Places
Houses in Kittitas County, Washington
National Register of Historic Places in Kittitas County, Washington
Railway buildings and structures on the National Register of Historic Places in Washington (state)
1909 establishments in Washington (state)
Buildings and structures completed in 1909